Apiwat Ngaolamhin (born June 1, 1986) is a Thai professional footballer who plays as a centre-back.

International career

In June 2013, Apiwat debuted for Thailand against North Korea in a friendly match.

International

Honours

Club
Buriram United
 Thai League 1 (2): 2018, 2021–22
 Thai FA Cup (1): 2021–22
 Thai League Cup (1): 2021–22
 Thailand Champions Cup (1): 2019

References

External links
 Apiwat Ngaolamhin at Goal

1986 births
Living people
Apiwat Ngaolamhin
Apiwat Ngaolamhin
Association football central defenders
Apiwat Ngaolamhin
Apiwat Ngaolamhin
Apiwat Ngaolamhin
Apiwat Ngaolamhin
Apiwat Ngaolamhin
Apiwat Ngaolamhin
Apiwat Ngaolamhin